The Daban Masara airstrike hit a fish market in the village of Kwatar Daban Masara, Borno State, Nigeria on 26 September 2021, killing between 50 and 60 people.

Attack
Ten days before the airstrike, foreign fighters from ISWAP had arrived in Kwatar Daban Masara in trucks. This led to the town being placed under surveillance by Nigerian intelligence.

On September 26, 2021, the military had sources saying that ISWAP was planning an attack from the town. The air force decided to act and at around 6:00 AM local time an air force jet carried out a "preemptive strike" on the fish market in the village, killing at least 50-60 civilians.

See also
Rann bombing

References

2021 airstrikes
2021 in Nigeria
2020s in Borno State
2020s massacres in Nigeria
Airstrikes in Africa
Boko Haram insurgency
Islamic State of Iraq and the Levant
Marketplace attacks in Nigeria
Massacres in 2021
Nigerian Air Force
September 2021 events in Africa